Ian Anderson (born 7 August 1935) is a South African cricketer. He played in twenty-one first-class matches for Eastern Province from 1955/56 to 1958/59.

See also
 List of Eastern Province representative cricketers

References

External links
 

1935 births
Living people
South African cricketers
Eastern Province cricketers
Sportspeople from Port Elizabeth